Leyte frog may refer to:

 Leyte slender stream frog (Hylarana albotuberculata), a frog in the family Ranidae endemic to the islands of Leyte, Samar, and Mindanao in the Philippines
 Leyte tree frog (Philautus leitensis), a frog in the family Rhacophoridae endemic to the Philippines

Animal common name disambiguation pages